The United Kingdom Championship Special was a professional wrestling streaming event produced by the American promotion WWE. The event was filmed on 7 May 2017 and aired on 19 May exclusively on the WWE Network. The event was held at Epic Studios in Norwich, Norfolk, England and featured the participation of competitors from WWE's United Kingdom division and the 205 Live programme.

Background
On 15 December 2016, at The O2 Arena, Triple H announced that the following month, WWE would crown its inaugural WWE United Kingdom Champion. A tournament to crown the inaugural champion occurred as the United Kingdom Championship Tournament event, which took place over two days on 14 and 15 January 2017. The tournament and championship were won by Tyler Bate, who at the time became the youngest wrestler to hold a WWE singles championship at 19 years old.

On 15 May 2017, a follow-up to the UK Championship tournament was announced by WWE, titled the "United Kingdom Championship Special." Jim Ross and Nigel McGuinness were announced as the commentators for the event. The event was filmed on 7 May and aired on tape delay on 19 May exclusively on the WWE Network. It was held at Epic Studios in Norwich, Norfolk, England and featured the participation of the competitors from WWE's United Kingdom division and the 205 Live programme.

Results

See also

Professional wrestling in the United Kingdom

References

External links 
 

2017 WWE Network events
May 2017 events in the United Kingdom
Special